887 Alinda is a very eccentric, near-Earth asteroid with an Earth minimum orbit intersection distance (MOID) of 0.092 AU. It is the namesake for the Alinda group of asteroids and measures about 4 kilometers in diameter. The stony S-type asteroid was discovered by German astronomer Max Wolf at Heidelberg Observatory on 3 January 1918.

Due to its high eccentricity and semi-major axis of 0.57 and 2.5 AU, respectively, it is a typical Amor III asteroid. It has both, a 1:3 orbital resonance with Jupiter and a close to 4:1 resonance with Earth. As a result of the resonance with Jupiter that has excited the eccentricity of the orbit over the eons, the asteroid's orbit has evolved to spend time outside of the main-belt. It is the namesake for the Alinda group of asteroids.

Alinda makes close approaches to Earth, including a pass in January 2025, where it comes within  of Earth.

The asteroid's name had been proposed by H. Kobol. It is uncertain whether it refers to the ancient city of Alinda in modern western Turkey, or to a mythological figure of the Australian aboriginals.

References

External links 
 
 
 

000887
000887
Discoveries by Max Wolf
Named minor planets
000887
19180103